The North-East Frontier Agency (NEFA), originally known as the North-East Frontier Tracts (NEFT), was one of the political divisions in British India, and later the Republic of India until 20 January 1972, when it became the Union Territory of Arunachal Pradesh and some parts of Assam. Its  administrative headquarters was Shillong (until 1974, when it was transferred to Itanagar). It received the status of State on 20 February 1987.

History

Tracts (1914–1954) 

In 1914, some tribal-majority areas were separated from the former Darrang and Lakhimpur districts of Assam Province of British India to form the North-East Frontier Tract (NEFT). The NEFT was initially divided into two sections: (i) the Central and Eastern Section (made up of  the former Dibrugarh Frontier Tract (created in 1884) and some more areas in the South) and (ii) the Western Section. Each section was placed under a political officer. In 1919, the Central and Eastern Section was renamed the Sadiya Frontier Tract, and the Western Section was renamed the Balipara Frontier Tract. In 1937, Sadiya and Balipara Frontier Tracts along with Lakhimpur Frontier Tract (also created in 1919) of Assam Province came to be known collectively as the 'Excluded Areas of province of Assam' under the provisions of Government of India Act, 1935. By Regulation 1 of The North Eastern Frontier Tracts (Internal Administration) Regulations 1943, Tirap Frontier Tract was created by amalgamating certain areas of Sadiya and Lakhimpur Frontier Tracts. After this a new regulation – The Assam Frontier (Administration of Justice) Regulation, 1945 – was made by the Governor of Assam using his powers under Section 92(2) of the Government of India Act, 1935. This proved to be a landmark step in the history of NEFA which later emerged as the state of Arunachal Pradesh. In 1946, Balipara Frontier Tract was divided into two administrative units: Sela Sub-Agency and Subansiri Area.

After the independence of India in 1947, NEFT became a part of the Assam state. 
In 1948, Sadiya Frontier Tract was bifurcated into two districts: Abor Hills district and Mishmi Hills district. In 1950, the plain portions of these tracts, (Balipara Frontier Tract, Tirap Frontier Tract, Abor Hills district, and Mishmi Hills district) were transferred to the Assam state government and the rest became one of the Tribal Areas in Assam state (under part-B of the table appended to paragraph 20 of the sixth schedule of the Indian constitution).
In 1951, Balipara Frontier Tract, Tirap Frontier Tract, Abor Hills district, Mishmi Hills district and the Naga tribal areas were together renamed as the North-East Frontier Agency (NEFA).

Agency (1954–1972) 

In 1954, the Balipara Frontier Tract was bifurcated into (1) Kameng Frontier Division, and (2) Subansiri Frontier Division; (3) Tirap Frontier Tract was renamed Tirap Frontier Division. (4) Abor Hill’s District was renamed Siang Frontier Division and (5) Mishmi Hills District was renamed Lohit Frontier Division (the Naga tribal area known as Tuensang Frontier Division, which was until then also part of the territory, in 1957, was excluded from the territory). The territory was collectively known as NorthEast Frontier Agency, popularly NEFA.

On 26 January 1954, the North-East Frontier Agency was divided into six frontier divisions: Kameng (formerly Sela Sub-Agency), Subansiri (formerly Subansiri area), Tirap (formerly Tirap Frontier Tract), Siang (formerly Abor Hills district), Lohit (formerly Mishmi Hills district) and Tuensang. On 1 December 1957, Tuensang was separated and attached to the newly formed Naga Hills district to form Naga Hills-Tuensang Area. On 1 August 1965 the administration of the agency was transferred from the Ministry of External Affairs to the Ministry of Home Affairs. Consequently, on 1 December 1965, the five frontier divisions (Kameng, Subansiri, Siang, Lohit, and Tirap) became its five districts. A deputy commissioner became the administrative head of these districts in place of a political officer.
In 1967, an Agency Council was constituted for better administration. Until 1972, it was constitutionally a part of the Assam state and was directly administered by the governor of Assam as an agent of the President of India. On 21 January 1972, the North-East Frontier Agency became the Union Territory of Arunachal Pradesh and was placed under the charge of a Chief Commissioner.

See also
Arunachal Pradesh

References

Citations

Sources 
 Why China is playing hardball in Arunachal by Venkatesan Vembu, Daily News & Analysis, 13 May 2007

Further reading
Bose, Manilal (1997). History of Arunachal Pradesh, New Delhi: Concept Publishing Company, .

Agencies of British India
History of Arunachal Pradesh